Nabokino is a rural locality (a settlement) in Starooskolsky District, Belgorod Oblast, Russia. The population was 135 as of 2010. There are 7 streets.

Geography 
Nabokino is located 14 km north of Stary Oskol (the district's administrative centre) by road. Novokladovoye is the nearest rural locality.

References 

Rural localities in Starooskolsky District